1867 was the 81st season of cricket in England since the foundation of Marylebone Cricket Club (MCC). Yorkshire achieved a perfect season in first-class cricket, something not likely to be equaled on covered pitches due to the high frequency of drawn matches, and even beforehand much more difficult due to the increased scoring after 1870, produced by the usage of a heavy roller and the disappearance of the abundant shooters, which previously made batting very tough. The season is, however, best known for a schism between the northern and southern professionals that led to the North v South game, one of the major "representative" fixtures of the time, being suspended for several years because northern professionals refused to play in London for want of better conditions.

Events
 30 May: In the first county match of the season, James Ricketts, on his first-class debut, scores 195 not out. At the time it was the highest score in purely county cricket, and it was the highest score by a batsman on debut in first-class cricket between Tom Marsden's 227 in 1826 and Norman Callaway scoring 207 in his sole first-class match in February 1915.
 13 June: Charles Robertson Young becomes the youngest to play first-class cricket in England until Barney Gibson in 2011 when he played for Hampshire against Kent at fifteen years 131 days
 A schism between the northern professionals (Yorkshire, Nottinghamshire and Cambridgeshire) and their southern counterparts, led by veteran batsman George Parr, who demanded improved remuneration and guaranteed benefits for their services, dominated the season. This schism, which had roots dating back to 1864, meant that in 1867 and 1868:
 the annual match between the All England Eleven and the United All England Eleven, which had been played since 1857 in London was played very early in the season at Old Trafford - then in its infancy as a first-class venue - then permanently cancelled. The United All England Eleven later divided into the "United North of England Eleven" and "United South of England Eleven", with the latter being dominated by W. G. Grace.
 the northern professionals were not seen at Lord's or The Oval and the Players' elevens for the two annual Gentlemen v Players games in London was composed of Surrey and Marylebone players only, and their attraction to the public was materially reduced
 the North v South game was replaced by "North of the Thames v South of the Thames"
 Yorkshire County Cricket Club won all seven of its matches played. Except for Sussex in 1871 and Lancashire in 1872, who both played only four games against weak opponents, no county since has equalled this "perfect season", though Gloucestershire in 1877 came within one wicket of doing so and Nottinghamshire in 1884 within three. Since the official County Championship began in 1890, the nearest approaches to winning every game have been:
 Surrey in 1892 with thirteen wins, two losses and a draw in sixteen games
 Surrey in 1894 with thirteen wins, two losses and a tie in sixteen games
 Nottinghamshire in 1907 with fifteen wins, four draws and one abandoned game in a twenty-game schedule
 Surrey in 1955 with 23 wins and five losses in a twenty-eight game schedule
Warwickshire in 1995 with fourteen wins, two losses and one draw in seventeen games

Playing record (by county)

Leading batsmen (qualification 10 innings)

Leading bowlers (qualification 800 balls)

References

Annual reviews
 John Lillywhite's Cricketer's Companion (Green Lilly), Lillywhite, 1868
 Arthur Haygarth, Scores & Biographies, Volume 10 (1867–1868), Lillywhite, 1869

External links
 CricketArchive – season summaries

1867 in English cricket
English cricket seasons in the 19th century